Jozef Antoon Leo Maria Vergote (1910–1992) was a Flemish Egyptologist and Coptologist. He was born on 16 March 1910 in Gent, Belgium. He received his doctorate degree in classical philology and oriental languages in 1932 from the Catholic University of Leuven. He continued his studies in Paris, and in Berlin (1934–1937), where he worked under Kurt Heinrich Sethe, Hermann Grapow, and Rudolph Anthes. He taught Coptic and ancient Egyptian at the Catholic University of Leuven from 1938 until he retired in 1978. He was the editor of Orientalia Lovaniensia Periodica and published widely. Among this most important publications are Joseph en Égypte (1959), Toutankhamon dans les archives hittites (1961), and Grammaire copte (1973–1983). He died in Heverlee, Belgium on 8 January 1992.

1910 births
1992 deaths
Belgian Egyptologists
Coptologists
Catholic University of Leuven alumni